Jahriziño Winston Valentijn (born 2 December 1984 in Paramaribo, Suriname) is a Dutch footballer who currently plays for FC Lienden.

Life 
Valentijn is a defender who was born in Paramaribo and raised in Amsterdam.

Career 
He made his debut in professional football, being part of the FC Utrecht squad in the 2006-07 season.

References

1984 births
Living people
Dutch footballers
Surinamese emigrants to the Netherlands
FC Utrecht players
Footballers from Amsterdam
AGOVV Apeldoorn players
Sportspeople from Paramaribo
ADO Den Haag players
Eredivisie players
Eerste Divisie players
Association football defenders
Haaglandia players
FC Lienden players